Jameka Jones (born September 13, 1978) is a former professional basketball player for the Miami Sol of the Women's National Basketball Association.

WNBA
In 2000, Jones became the second player ever from UNCC to play in the WNBA, joining Markita Aldrige.

Honors and awards
C-USA all-tournament team

References

External links

1978 births
Guards (basketball)
Miami Sol players
Living people